The Ffos Las racecourse (strictly: Ffos Las Racecourse & Conference Centre) is a Welsh horse racing, equestrian sports and conferencing venue situated in Ffos Las, Wales. The Ffos Las racecourse was built at the site of an open cast coal mine after mining operations ceased.

Development
After the completion of the first phase of construction for a first race meeting in June 2009, the Ffos Las racecourse became the first new National Hunt racecourse to be built in the United Kingdom for 80 years, and Wales's third racecourse. Ffos Las Racecourse was built at a cost of £20 million. The racetrack itself is an oval which is 12 furlongs in length and has a flat topography.

The initial phase of the development was completed in 2009 and features:
 Turf National Hunt & flat racing
 Enclosure & Grandstand
 Hotel, pub, restaurant, etc.
 Technical Facilities
 Betting Facilities
 Residential Development for racing staff

Opening meetings
The British Horseracing Board initially confirmed a programme of eight race meetings for 2009. An extra fixture was added to the schedule later on creating a two-day flat event in September.

The Ffos Las Racecourse opened on 18 June 2009 when it held its first race meeting to a sell-out crowd of 10,000.  It was an evening National Hunt meeting which included a Ladies Night.  The first ever race at Ffos Las was won by 15-8 second favourite Plunkett ridden by Donal Fahy, trained by Evan Williams, and owned by Hywel Jones.  The first race at Ffos Las to feature Arabians was held on 27 June 2009.

The first ever flat race at Ffos Las, the EBF/Jamie Yeates Memorial Maiden Stakes, was held on 21 July 2009.  The race was dedicated to schoolboy and aspiring jockey Jamie Yeates from nearby Llanelli, who died under tragic circumstances the previous January.  The winner of the race was Dream Queen ridden by Michael Hills.  Dream Queen was trained by Barry Hills.

The official opening ceremony, conducted by racing commentator Sir Peter O'Sullevan, was held on 28 August 2009, with an audience of over 12,000.  Following the final race of the day, there was concert with Cerys Matthews performing.

The first ever race meeting featuring harness racing was held on 9 May 2010.

Notable races

Plans
The racecourse owners intend to introduce a new Celtic Festival in future years to be held around St. David's Day.  The racecourse developers plan for the venue to have a capacity for 20,000 people and there will be 120 horse boxes.

Future developments at the racecourse will include:
 Development of Hotel & Leisure Facilities
 Equestrian Centre, Eventing, Point-to-Point
 Racecourse Training Establishment
 Live/work small holdings

The racecourse management intend to stage other types of equestrian events at Ffos Las including Show jumping, hunter chase meetings, pony racing and harness racing.

Transport
First Cymru Buses operate a bus between Llanelli and Carmarthen, number 197 from Monday to Saturday, which stops at the racecourse entrance.  The Ffos Las racecourse offers a dedicated shuttle bus service on race days between Llanelli railway station and the racecourse.

By sea, Pembroke Dock is about 1 hour away to the west and Fishguard is about 1 hour 15 minutes away to the west.  Ferries from both Pembroke Dock and Fishguard sail to and from Rosslare in the Republic of Ireland.

Pembrey Airport, which handles private, charter flights and fueling facilities 24/7. It is a 10-minute drive away from the racecourse with a restaurant and seven miles of blue ribbon beach.  Helicopters can land at the racecourse by arrangement with the racecourse management and refuel at the airport if required.

Ffos Las is approximately 12 miles (25 minutes) from Junction 48 of the M4 motorway.

References

External links
Ffos Las (official racecourse site)

Sport in Carmarthenshire
Horse racing venues in Wales
Buildings and structures in Carmarthenshire
Sports venues completed in 2009
2009 establishments in the United Kingdom
Ffos Las racecourse